Boletus mamorensis is an edible fungus of the genus Boletus native to Morocco. It is closely related to B. aereus.

See also

List of Boletus species

References

External links

Edible fungi
Fungi described in 1978
mamorensis
Fungi of Africa